Kaadé is a town in western Ivory Coast. It is a sub-prefecture of Guiglo Department in Cavally Region, Montagnes District.

Kaadé was a commune until March 2012, when it became one of 1126 communes nationwide that were abolished.

In 2014, the population of the sub-prefecture of Kaadé was 25,253.

Villages
The 6 villages of the sub-prefecture of Kaadé and their population in 2014 are:
 Béoua (4 507)
 Guézon (1 144)
 Guinkin (5 964)
 Kaadé (6 853)
 Niouldé (3 430)
 Troya 2 (3 355)

References

Sub-prefectures of Cavally Region
Former communes of Ivory Coast